West Island Conservation Park is a protected area occupying both West Island and Seal Island in coastal waters near Victor Harbor in South Australia.  The park was proclaimed in 1972 following the enactment of the National Parks and Wildlife Act 1972 with the protection initially applying to West Island only which itself previously had reserve status under the Fauna Conservation Act 1964-1965.  Seal Island was added to the park in 1979.  The purpose of the park is to protect the breeding populations of bird species present on both islands such as little penguins, silver gulls, crested terns, Caspian terns and fairy terns.  The conservation park is classified as an IUCN Category Ia protected area.
In 1982, it was listed on the now-defunct Register of the National Estate.

References

External links
Webpage on the Protected Planet website

Conservation parks of South Australia
Protected areas established in 1966
1966 establishments in Australia
South Australian places listed on the defunct Register of the National Estate